Robert Matthew Beatham, VC (16 June 1894 – 11 August 1918) was a British-born Australian recipient of the Victoria Cross, the highest award for gallantry "in the face of the enemy" that can be awarded to British and Commonwealth forces. He saw action in the Australian Imperial Force during the First World War and fell at the Battle of Amiens.

Early life 
Beatham was born on 16 June 1894 to John and Elizabeth Beatham, who resided at Glassonby, Cumberland, England. He was educated at a local school and as a teenager, he emigrated to Australia with his brother Walter. He was labouring at Geelong in Victoria when he volunteered for the Australian Imperial Force on 8 January 1915.

First World War 
Beatham was posted to the 8th Battalion with the rank of private. He embarked on HMAT Hororata from Melbourne on 17 April 1915 for Suez but returned to Australia in August 1915 due to venereal disease. After recuperating he embarked for Gallipoli as a reinforcement for 8th Battalion.  He saw nearly a month of active service at Gallipoli before the general evacuation to Alexandria.

From there Beatham was sent to France, arriving with his battalion in Marseilles on 31 March 1916 en route for the Western Front. Later that year he participated in the Battle of Pozières during which he was wounded. After six weeks of recuperation he rejoined his unit in late September 1917. He was wounded a second time on 4 October 1917 at Broodseinde during the Battle of Passchendaele and was evacuated to England for treatment and recovery. During his sojourn in England he was found guilty of being absent without leave over the New Year of 1918 and was given field punishment and a forfeit of pay. He rejoined his unit in February 1918.

On 9 August 1918 at Rosières, east of Amiens, on the second day of the Battle of Amiens, Beatham's battalion was attacking high ground when it was held up by heavy machine gun fire after supporting armour was knocked out of action.  Beatham, accompanied by Lance Corporal W. G. Nottingham, made four charges to knock out a series of German machine gun posts holding back the advance of the Australians. Wounded in the leg during the first charge, he was killed taking out a final machine gun post on 11 August. For his gallantry he was posthumously awarded the Victoria Cross (VC). Gazetted on 14 December 1918, the citation for his VC read as follows:

Beatham is buried at Heath Cemetery, in Harbonnières. His Victoria Cross is held in a private collection in Melbourne. It sold in 1999 for a then record price for an Australian VC of A$178,500.

Six of his brothers saw active service in the First World War; three died and another spent two years as a prisoner of war. Robert's younger brother Walter also enlisted in the AIF and served with 21st Battalion and survived the war.

Honours and awards

Notes

References 
 McWilliams, James; Steel, R. James. 2008. Amiens 1918 – The Last Great Battle. History Press: United Kingdom.
 Thompson, Roger C. 1979. 'Beatham, Robert Matthew (1894–1918)'. Australian Dictionary of Biography, Volume 7. Melbourne University Press: Melbourne.
 

1894 births
1918 deaths
Military personnel from Cumberland
People from Eden District
Australian World War I recipients of the Victoria Cross
Australian Army soldiers
Australian military personnel killed in World War I
British emigrants to Australia
Burials at Heath Cemetery, Harbonnieres